SHF may refer to:

 Sheffield station, whose station code is SHF
 Shihezi Huayuan Airport's IATA code
 Simian hemorrhagic fever, disease affecting monkeys
 Skara HF, handball club in Skara, Sweden
 Société de l'histoire de France, a society formed in 1833 to study French history
 Souther-Hillman-Furay Band, a mid-1970s country-rock band
 Super high frequency, radio frequencies (RF) in the range of 3 GHz and 30 GHz
 Sydney Heritage Fleet, a ship preservation organisation in Sydney, Australia